Myatt's Fields Park is a 14-acre Victorian park in Camberwell in the London Borough of Lambeth in South London, England, 2.9 miles south-east of Charing Cross.

History
The majority of the area of Myatt's Fields belonged to the estate of Sir Hughes Minet, who in 1770 bought 118 acres of land from Sir Edward Knatchbull on the border of Camberwell and Lambeth. Minet was a third generation descendant of Isaac Minet, a French Huguenot refugee who had fled France following the 1685 Revocation of the Edict of Nantes. The names of some of the streets around the park, such as Calais Street and Cormont Road, refer to Minet's French connection.

In 1889, Hughes Minet's descendant William Minet gave 14½ acres of land then in the parish of Camberwell to the London County Council to be used for a public park. Initially to be called Camberwell Park, the name Myatt’s Fields was settled on in 1889. In 1900 the irregular Lambeth/Camberwell boundary was tidied up, transferring the park from Camberwell to Lambeth. The Metropolitan Public Gardens Association then spent some £10,000 on the layout of the park, and it was opened on 13 April 1889. In 1935, William Minet's daughter, Susan Minet, gave a further quarter of an acre of land near the junction of Knatchbull Road and Calais Street to the park. Minet family philanthropy also resulted in the construction on the adjacent Knatchbull Road of the neighbouring St James the Apostle church (now converted to flats), the Minet Library, and Longfield Hall, a community hall.

The park was designed by Fanny Wilkinson, Britain's first professional woman landscape gardener. Wilkinson was assisted by Emmeline Sieveking, the daughter of Queen Victoria's physician, Sir Edward Sieveking. It is named after Joseph Myatt, a tenant market gardener, who grew strawberries and rhubarb (for which he was famed) on the land in the 19th century. The park's mulberry tree may date from the land's previous use as a market garden.

In 2009, a £2.6m renovation of the park was completed with funding from the Heritage Lottery Fund and Lambeth Council, as well as £300,000 raised by the Myatt's Fields Park Project Group. The MFPPG is run by local volunteers and was chaired from 2000 until 2011 by Lindsay Avebury (the daughter of Pamela Hansford Johnson and the wife of Eric Lubbock). The current chair is Marjorie Landels. Both the park itself and the bandstand in it are Grade II listed.

The singer Florence Welch of Florence and the Machine grew up near the park and has said that her earliest memory was of climbing trees in the park.

The park was once described by former Poet Laureate John Betjeman as a "strangely beautiful place."

Features
The Park includes a bandstand, summerhouse, and café. It is also home to tennis courts, a football pitch, basketball court, picnic area, a children's playground and a community greenhouse.

In 2015, Myatt's Field was voted the 9th best park in the UK in a public vote organised by the Green Flag Award.

References

External links
Information on the park from Lambeth Council
Myatt's Fields Park Project Group
Nature Area Management Plan
British History Online - Myatt's Fields, Denmark Hill and Herne Hill

Parks and open spaces in the London Borough of Lambeth
Camberwell